The Richard Sparrow House is a historic house at 42 Summer Street in Plymouth, Massachusetts and the oldest surviving house in Plymouth.

The house was built around 1640 by Richard Sparrow, an English surveyor who arrived in Plymouth in 1636. He was granted a  tract of land in 1636 on which the house was later built. Sparrow moved to Eastham in 1653. The Richard Sparrow House was added to the National Register of Historic Places in 1974.  The house is now operated as a house museum and art gallery and is part of Plymouth Village Historic District.

See also
List of the oldest buildings in Massachusetts
National Register of Historic Places listings in Plymouth County, Massachusetts

References

External links
Sparrow House Website

Houses in Plymouth, Massachusetts
Historic house museums in Massachusetts
Museums in Plymouth, Massachusetts
Plymouth Colony
Houses completed in 1640
National Register of Historic Places in Plymouth County, Massachusetts
British colonial architecture in the United States
Colonial architecture in Massachusetts
1640 establishments in Massachusetts
Houses on the National Register of Historic Places in Plymouth County, Massachusetts
First period houses in Massachusetts (1620–1659)